John Bergstedt (born 2 August 1969) is a Swedish ski mountaineer.

Bergstedt was born in Östersund and has been member of the national team since 2007. He started ski mountaineering in 2006 and competed first in the Vertex Vinter race in 2007. He lives in Trillevallen.

Selected results 
 2007:
 1st, Bix Cup Oppdal single
 1st, Bix Cup Oppdal team
 6th, European Championship (relay race (together with Patrik Nordin, André Jonsson and Joakim Halvarsson)
 2008:
 10th, World Championship (relay race (together with Patrik Nordin, André Jonsson and Björn Gund)

External links 
 John Bergstedt at skimountaineering.org

1969 births
Living people
Swedish male ski mountaineers
People from Östersund
Sportspeople from Jämtland County